The People First Republican Party of Ontario was a minor political party in Ontario, Canada, registered by Elections Ontario in 2004 as the Republican Party of Ontario. It nominated one to three candidates in the provincial elections of 2007, 2011, and 2015. The party was founded by Trueman Tuck, a former Freedom Party of Ontario candidate.

Party platform 
The party was opposed to corporations, describing itself as a grassroots organization that would grant small businesses more authority. It described itself as multifaith, and advocated for family values and equality.

Election results

External links 
 Official party website

Political parties established in 2007
Provincial political parties in Ontario
Belleville, Ontario
2007 establishments in Ontario